The Lodge Grass City Jail, in Lodge Grass, Montana, was built in 1930.  It was listed on the National Register of Historic Places in 1987.

It is a square poured concrete structure.

Also known as Old City Jail, it is located on an alley south of Third Avenue.  The alley is parallel to, and in between, Main Street and Helen Street.

References

Jails on the National Register of Historic Places in Montana
National Register of Historic Places in Big Horn County, Montana
Government buildings completed in 1930
1930 establishments in Montana